Neli Kodrič Filipić (born 12 May 1964) is a Slovene children's writer. Her first book Lov na zvezde (Star Hunting) won her the Levstik Award and all her following books have been popular with young readers.

Kodrič was born in Postojna in 1960. She studied graphic design at the Academy of Fine Arts in Ljubljana, but works as a writer of juvenile fiction.

Published works

 Lov na zvezde (Star Hunting), 1995
 TITA@boginja.smole.in.težav.si (Tita@goddess.of.bad.luck.and.trouble.si), 2002
 Na drugi strani (On the Other Side), 2004
 49:03:39 (49:03:39), 2008
 Sreča je (Happiness Is), 2008
 Punčka in velikan (The Girl and the Giant), 2009
 Jasmin in srečni cekin (Jasmin and the Lucky Coin), 2009
 Kaj ima ljubezen s tem (What's Love Got to Do with It), 2009
 Ali te lahko objamem močno? (Can I Hug You Hard?), 2011

References

Slovenian children's writers
20th-century Slovenian women writers
21st-century Slovenian women writers
Slovenian women children's writers
Living people
1964 births
People from Postojna
Levstik Award laureates
University of Ljubljana alumni